Hattingen is a town in the northern part of the Ennepe-Ruhr-Kreis district, in North Rhine-Westphalia, Germany.

History

Hattingen is located on the south bank of the River Ruhr in the south of the Ruhr region. The town was first mentioned in 1396, when the Duke of Mark granted permission to build a city wall. Today, Hattingen has a picturesque historic district with Fachwerk (timber-framed houses) built between the 14th and 16th centuries. The old city is still partly surrounded by the city walls today.

There are three castles remaining within the municipal area of Hattingen. Isenburg Castle was built in the 12th century in the hillsides above the Ruhr. The castle was destroyed in 1225, but prominent ruins remain. Blankenstein Castle was built in the 13th century above the Ruhr river and Haus Kemnade is a moated castle from the 16th century. All three castles are famous tourist landmarks and open to the public.

Hattingen became part of the Hanseatic League in 1554 and became an important trading town. In 1720, there were 52 operating coal mines within the municipal area and Hattingen became one of the first industrial cities of the Ruhr region. Steel production started in 1853, when the Henrichshütte was founded. The Henrichshütte became one of the most important employers of the whole region and dominated the town until it closed in 1987.

Today, Hattingen still faces problems concerning structural change of the economy, but is becoming a centre of tourism, especially its historical downtown.

Neighbouring cities 

The cities bordering Hattingen are Bochum, Essen, Sprockhövel, Velbert, Witten and Wuppertal.

Division of the town 
Hattingen is divided into the districts of Blankenstein, Bredenscheid-Stüter, Hattingen-Mitte, Holthausen, Niederbonsfeld, Niederelfringhausen, Niederwenigern, Oberelfringhausen, Oberstüter, Welper and Winz-Baak.

Notable people
 Mathilde Franziska Anneke, feminist
 Erich Warsitz, world's first jet pilot
 John J. Gumperz, sociolinguist
 Harald Siepermann, Character Designer
 Marie-Luise Marjan, actress
 Jamiri (Jan-Michael Richter), comic artist
 Andreas Bieber, singer and actor
 Mirjam Müntefering, author
 Caliban (band)
 DJ Quicksilver, Disk Jockey
 Jost Gippert, German linguist
 Luke Hemmerich, German Football Player

Politics

In the local elections of 2004 the Social Democratic Party (SPD) was the largest party on the council with 24 seats. It was followed by the Christian Democratic Union (CDU) with 18 and the Alliance 90/The Greens with 7, the WBG (a conservative lis) and Free Democrats with four each, FLW (also a conservative list) with three, National Democratic Party two, and the PDS/WAL (socialists) and AUF Witten (a left wing list) with one each.

From 2004 to 2020, for the first time in its history, the council was led by a female mayor: Sonja Leidemann (SPD). In the election of 2020 she lost her mandate to Lars König (CDU).

Mayor
The current mayor of Hattingen is Dirk Glaser, who ran as an independent. The most recent mayoral election was held on 13 September 2020, with a runoff held on 27 September, and the results were as follows:

! rowspan=2 colspan=2| Candidate
! rowspan=2| Party
! colspan=2| First round
! colspan=2| Second round
|-
! Votes
! %
! Votes
! %
|-
| bgcolor=| 
| align=left| Dirk Glaser
| align=left| Independent
| 8,756
| 39.4
| 9,356
| 58.3
|-
| bgcolor=| 
| align=left| Frank Mielke
| align=left| Social Democratic Party
| 6,723
| 30.2
| 6,695
| 41.7
|-
| bgcolor=| 
| align=left| Frank Staacken
| align=left| Alliance 90/The Greens
| 4,281
| 19.3
|-
| bgcolor=| 
| align=left| Christian Siever
| align=left| Independent
| 1,285
| 5.8
|-
| bgcolor=| 
| align=left| Thomas Bausch
| align=left| Independent
| 1,185
| 5.3
|-
! colspan=3| Valid votes
! 22,230
! 97.3
! 16,051
! 99.0
|-
! colspan=3| Invalid votes
! 614
! 2.7
! 154
! 1.0
|-
! colspan=3| Total
! 22,844
! 100.0
! 16,205
! 100.0
|-
! colspan=3| Electorate/voter turnout
! 45,151
! 50.6
! 45,151
! 35.9
|-
| colspan=7| Source: City of Hattingen (1st round, 2nd round)
|}

City council 

The Hattingen city council governs the city alongside the Mayor. The most recent city council election was held on 13 September 2020, and the results were as follows:

! colspan=2| Party
! Votes
! %
! +/-
! Seats
! +/-
|-
| bgcolor=| 
| align=left| Social Democratic Party (SPD)
| 7,404
| 33.1
|  8.8
| 16
|  3
|-
| bgcolor=| 
| align=left| Christian Democratic Union (CDU)
| 6,893
| 30.9
|  2.8
| 15
| ±0
|-
| bgcolor=| 
| align=left| Alliance 90/The Greens (Grüne)
| 5,288
| 23.7
|  11.7
| 11
|  5
|-
| bgcolor=| 
| align=left| Free Democratic Party (FDP)
| 1,529
| 6.8
|  2.7
| 3
|  1
|-
| bgcolor=| 
| align=left| Die PARTEI
| 1,229
| 5.5
| New
| 3
| New
|-
! colspan=2| Valid votes
! 22,343
! 97.8
! 
! 
! 
|-
! colspan=2| Invalid votes
! 496
! 2.2
! 
! 
! 
|-
! colspan=2| Total
! 22,839
! 100.0
! 
! 48
!  2
|-
! colspan=2| Electorate/voter turnout
! 45,151
! 50.6
!  0.7
! 
! 
|-
| colspan=7| Source: City of Hattingen
|}

State Landtag
In the Landtag of North Rhine-Westphalia, Hattingen is part of the Ennepe-Ruhr-Kreis I constituency. Rainer Bovermann of the SPD has been representative since the constituency's creation in the 2005 election; he was most recently re-elected in 2017.

Federal parliament
In the Bundestag, Witten is part of the Ennepe-Ruhr-Kreis II constituency. Axel Echeverria of the SPD was elected as representative in the 2021 German federal election.

Gallery

References

External links 

  

Towns in North Rhine-Westphalia
Members of the Hanseatic League
Ennepe-Ruhr-Kreis